Clifton railway station may refer to:

United Kingdom 
 Clifton railway station, Bristol, the original name of Hotwells railway station
 Clifton Bridge railway station, which served Hotwells in Bristol
 Clifton Down railway station serving Clifton, Bristol
 Clifton and Lowther railway station which served the village of Clifton on the Lancaster to Carlisle line, Cumbria
 Clifton railway station (Greater Manchester) serving Clifton, in the Metropolitan Borough of Salford
 Clifton Mayfield railway station which served Clifton, Derbyshire
 Clifton Mill railway station which served Clifton-upon-Dunsmore, Warwickshire
 Clifton Moor railway station which served the village of Clifton on the Eden Valley Railway, Cumbria
 Clifton Road railway station which served the village of Clifton, Brighouse, West Yorkshire
 Clifton-on-Trent railway station which served the villages of North and South Clifton in eastern Nottinghamshire

United States 
Clifton station (Erie Railroad), which served Clifton, New Jersey
Clifton station (NJ Transit), serving Clifton, New Jersey
Clifton station (Staten Island Railway) serving Clifton, Staten Island, New York
Clifton station (Virginia), in Clifton, Virginia, USA

See also 
 Clinton station (disambiguation)